Abamia is one of eleven parishes in Cangas de Onís, a municipality within the province and autonomous community of Asturias, in northern Spain. It is situated in the Picos de Europa mountains.

External links
 Official website 

Parishes in Cangas de Onis